The Very Long Baseline Array (VLBA) is a system of ten radio telescopes which are operated remotely from their Array Operations Center located in Socorro, New Mexico, as a part of the National Radio Astronomy Observatory (NRAO). These ten radio antennas work together as an array that forms the longest system in the world that uses very long baseline interferometry.

The construction of the VLBA began in February 1986 and it was completed in May 1993.  The first astrometrical observation using all ten antennas was carried out on May 29, 1993.  The total cost of building the VLBA was about $85 million. The array is funded by the National Science Foundation, and costs about $10 million a year to operate.

Each receiver in the VLBA consists of a parabolic dish antenna 25 meters (82 feet) in diameter, along with its adjacent control building. This contains the supporting electronics and machinery for the receiver, including low-noise electronics, digital computers, data storage units, and the antenna-pointing machinery. Each of the antennas is about as tall as a ten-story building when the antenna is pointed straight up, and each antenna weighs about 218 metric tons (240 short tons).

The signals from each antenna are recorded on a bank of approximately one-terabyte hard disc drives, and the information is time-stamped using atomic clocks. Once the disc drives are loaded with information, they are carried to the Pete V. Domenici Science Operations Center at the NRAO in Socorro. There, the information undergoes signal processing in a powerful set of digital computers that carry out the interferometry. These computers also make corrections for the rotation of the Earth, the slight shifts in the crust of the Earth over time, and other small measurement errors.

Observations by the VLBA 
The Very Long Baseline Array usually makes radio observations at wavelengths from three millimeters to 90 centimeters, or in other words, at frequencies from 0.3 gigahertz to 96 gigahertz. Within this frequency range, the VLBA observes in eight different frequency bands that are useful for radio astronomy. The VLBA also makes observations in two narrow radio bands below one gigahertz that include spectral lines produced by bright maser emissions.

The VLBA radio telescopes are located at:

High-Sensitivity Array
The use of the VLBA can be scheduled dynamically, and its sensitivity can be improved by a factor of five by including other radio telescopes such as the Green Bank Telescope in West Virginia, the Very Large Array (VLA) in New Mexico and the Effelsberg radio telescope in Germany. These three additional sites are brought online for as much as 100 hours per four-month trimester. In this configuration, the entire array is known as the High-Sensitivity Array (HSA). The Arecibo radio telescope in Puerto Rico was also used, before it collapsed.

Baseline distance and angular resolution

See also
 List of radio telescopes

References

External links

 

Radio telescopes
Interferometric telescopes
Kitt Peak National Observatory
1993 establishments in the United States